Rhenopterus is an extinct prehistoric eurypterid. Fossils of Rhenopterus have been recovered from deposits of Lower Devonian age in Germany.

Description
Rhenopterids were small, characterized by scattered tubercules and knobs on the outer surface of the exoskeleton. Their first two (or possibly three) pairs of walking legs had spines; the last two pairs were long and powerful, without spines. The prosoma (head) was subtrapezoidal, with arcuate compound eyes on parallel axes. The male genital appendages were short with two distal spines.

Species
Rhenopterus contains three valid species, with other named species now seen as invalid or part of other genera.
 Rhenopterus diensti Størmer, 1936  - Germany (Lower Devonian)
 Rhenopterus macrotuberculatus Størmer, 1974 - Alken an der Mosel, Germany (Devonian)
 Rhenopterus tuberculatus Størmer, 1936 - Germany (Devonian)
Invalid or reassigned species are listed below:
 "Rhenopterus" latus Størmer, 1936 - Germany (Devonian), synonym of R. diensti.
 "Rhenopterus" sievertsi Størmer, 1969 - Germany (Devonian), reclassified as a species of Adelophthalmus.

See also
 List of eurypterids

References

Rhenopteroidea
Devonian eurypterids
Prehistoric life of Europe
Eurypterids of Europe
Fossil taxa described in 1936